Max Purcell and Luke Saville were the defending champions but chose not to defend their title.

Harri Heliövaara and Patrik Niklas-Salminen won the title after defeating Ruben Gonzales and Evan King 6–4, 6–7(4–7), [10–7] in the final.

Seeds

Draw

References

External links
 Main draw

City of Playford Tennis International II - Men's Doubles